was the last head of the Izushi Domain. He later served as the Minister of Communications in Japan. He was a member of the House of Peers.

References

1843 births
1917 deaths

ja:仙石政固